Gottfried Kunz (12 December 1859 – 5 January 1930) was a Swiss politician and President of the Swiss Council of States (1912/1913).

External links 
 
 

1859 births
1930 deaths
Members of the Council of States (Switzerland)
Presidents of the Council of States (Switzerland)